Jhalu is a town and a nagar panchayat in Bijnor district in the Indian state of Uttar Pradesh.

Geography
It has an average elevation of 225 metres (738 feet).

Demographics
 India census, Jhalu had a population of 18,701. Males constitute 52% of the population and females 48%. Jhalu has an average literacy rate of 76%, now above  than the national average of 59.5%: male literacy is 53%, and female literacy is 38%. In Jhalu, 19% of the population is under 6 years of age.

References

Cities and towns in Bijnor district